Robelyn Annette Garcia (born September 16, 1965, in Phoenix, Arizona) is a former collegiate All-American and professional All-Star basketball player.  Garcia currently resides in Scottsdale, Arizona. She was the Big Six Championship Game MVP on the Kansas Crusaders of the Women's Basketball Association (WBA). Garcia was inducted into The Black Archives of Mid-America WBA Hall of Fame on February 22, 2020. Robelyn, nicknamed "Robbie" by her Junior College coach, also led the nation in scoring while playing at Dodge City Community College where she was inducted into the Athletic Hall of Fame.

High school

Garcia played at five different prep schools; she had a high scoring game of 56 points while playing six-on-six basketball in Oklahoma.  Robelyn also played two years for Wichita East High School and was an All-State Player at Elkhart High School in Elkhart, Kansas where she led her team in scoring.  She played on two All-Star teams her Senior-year including the Kansas vs Texas All-Star Challenge.  In addition, she was the leading scorer in The Boot Hill High School All-State game in 1983.
Garcia also played softball, soccer, volleyball, ran cross country and track and field in prep school.

College career 

Garcia had a stellar collegiate career with high scoring games of 46 and 40 points in her first year as a college player. She was a Region NJCAA All-American and led the Nation in scoring as a freshman, averaging 31.5 points per game before the implementation of the three-point line in the college game. Many of her points came from beyond what would have been the three-point arc.  She is the career All-time leading scorer at Dodge City College scoring 1,298 points in just two years.  She has held this title for over 33 years.  At Dodge City, Garcia earned All-America honors and was ranked as one of the top junior college swing guards in the country when she averaged 28 points and five rebounds per game as a sophomore in 1984–85. She ranked as the nation's fourth-leading scorer as a sophomore."
Garcia played at The University of Nebraska her junior year
and Friends University her senior year where she averaged 20 points per game and led her team and league in assists.  She was a unanimous KCAC First-Team selection and NAIA Region All-Star her senior year. Friends University Lady Falcons won the KCAC conference and made the NAIA National Tournament.  Her Friends University Hall of Fame Coach Jim Littell, now the head coach at Oklahoma State University, said "She's the greatest offensive talent I have ever coached. Passing, scoring, handling the ball".

Garcia was a multi-sport athlete in college; she also played softball, soccer, ran cross-country and track. She was honored in May 2015 with her induction into the Dodge City College Athletic Hall of Fame.

Professional 

Garcia played for several professional basketball teams and leagues, including the 1993 Champion Kansas Crusaders, Kansas City Mustangs and Tulsa Flames of the WBA. She also played in The Pro-Am, AAU Women's League, Guadalupe, Mexico, British Columbia, and was chosen to play in the Liberty Basketball Association (LBA) professional league.
Garcia's Kansas Crusaders team won the first WBA Championship in 1993.  Her Kansas City Mustangs team won the regular WBA season going undefeated 15–0 in 1994. Garcia was a 4-time WBA All-Star and is featured on the collector WBA All-Star Card Set by Fair Play Sports.  She is quoted several times and highlighted with five photos and a three-page spread in the 2017 best selling book and Documentary Film The Vision: The Untold Story of the Women's Basketball Association by Lightning Ned Mitchell. In addition, Garcia was awarded the oldest women's sports  award of Women's Basketball AAU Athlete of the year in 1992 while playing on her Championship Kansas City AAU Team.

Garcia also received the 2015 WBCBL Women's Professional Basketball "Trailblazer" Award on August 2, 2015, along with 9 other female basketball Icons including Cynthia Cooper, Nancy Lieberman, Sarah Campbell, E.C. Hill, Dr. Geri Kay Hart, Lynette Woodard, Kandi Conda, Lisa Leslie and Tamika Catchings. The award recognizes some of the most influential people in professional women's basketball, specifically those who helped blaze the trail, shape the overall landscape and pave the way for women's professional basketball. These 10 women have prevailed to greatness in a male dominated sport and give hope to young girls who inspire to be professional players, coaches, and team owners.

Garcia, her Kansas City Mustangs undefeated team, Kansas Crusaders Championship team and the entire Women's Basketball Association have a permanent display at The Black Archives of Mid-America WBA Hall of Fame.

Coaching career 

Garcia coached two seasons at Haskell Indian Nations University in Lawrence, Kansas while she was working on her Doctorate at The University of Kansas. She coached the Haskell Indian Nations Fighting Indians freshman team to a 20-0 undefeated season in 1992. Garcia also coached several semi-pro, exhibition and club teams including the touring team Christian Basketball.

Higher education 

Dr. Garcia finished her eleventh college diploma at Harvard University Extension School on May 26, 2020 with a Professional Graduate Certificate in Web Technologies. Her eighth college degree and third master's degree was a Master of Arts in Criminal Justice and Criminology at Arizona State University which also inducted her into the Arizona State Chapter of Phi Kappa Phi for her academic and scholarly achievement in May, 2014. In addition, she has a Ph.D. in Education Administration, a Master of Science in Kinesiology/Exercise Science, a Post-Doc Graduate Certificate in Gerontology, a master's in Aging and Lifespan Development, an Associate of Arts and Sciences and a Bachelor of Liberal Arts and General Studies.  Garcia began her second doctorate program at Arizona State University in Fall 2014; she is a Post-Doc in the Doctor of Behavioral Health program. Garcia began her twelfth college degree in the summer of 2018 at Harvard University studying for a master's degree in Digital Media and Museum Technology at Harvard University Extension School with anticipated graduation date in 2022. Further, Dr. Garcia completed a Bachelor of Metaphysical Science and is pursuing a third Doctorate degree at The University of Sedona and The University of Metaphysics to add Metaphysician to her list of titles.

In 2018 Dr. Garcia became an Arizona State University Faculty Affiliate in the Biomimicry Department. In addition to her post-secondary degrees, research and teaching she has several publications including her Guide to Coaching Youth Basketball.

Other activities 

Garcia began competition in 2014 for the Senior Olympics, 2015 regional Senior Games and the 2016 World Games. She won her first gold medal in the Senior Games in 2015 and won gold medals in the 2017, 2018 and 2019 Senior Olympics. Robelyn also won a gold medal at the World Senior Games in October, 2017.  Garcia is the President Emeritus of the Jr. NBA-WNBA and the Vice President of American Community Team Sports. She has been a professor in various academic fields for over twenty years.   Dr. Garcia began offering Jr. NBA - WNBA scholarships in 2011 in honor of her late Mother and launched her new Dr. Robelyn Garcia Scholarships in 2015. She is the official team sponsor for the new Kansas City Pro WBCBL team and also provides scholarships for Seniors 50+, Jr. NBA-WNBA Players, WBCBL Teams and College Scholar Athletes. Her volunteer work includes work with Bicycle Charities, The Arizona State University Doctor of Behavioral Health Student Forum, Special Olympics, Harvard University DCE Accessibility Services, Beatitudes Healthy Aging Adult Center and Senior University. Garcia was also a radio announcer for the WBA, DCCC, University of Nebraska, Friends University and Kansas City Public radio.  Dr. Garcia has been featured in and authored the afterword for the 2015 book "It's Your Go Season" by Kandi Conda. Her 2018 Kindle book titled "Consumer Health Awareness: A Guide to Intelligent Decisions for Selecting Integrative Holistic Medicine" is a best new short read on Amazon and featured on Goodreads.

See also 

 Women's Basketball Association
Women's American Basketball Association
 Women's Basketball
 Dodge City Conquistadors Notable Alumni & Hall of Fame

References

External links 
 WNBA Cards - WBA All Stars
 WBA Documentaries Collection
 History of Women's Professional basketball
 Beckett Cards
 WBA Photo & Article Archive
 KCAC Coverage Wichita Eagle
 Vimeo Basketball Research
 Association for Professional Basketball Research
 WNBA Basketball Cards
 Women's American Basketball Association#Results WBA Season Results
 Women's Basketball Timeline
 Women’s Professional Basketball Leagues
 1998 Steve Dimitry’s Extinct Sports Leagues
 WBA
 Robelyn Garcia Athlete
 Women's basketball#History Wikipedia History of the Women's basketball

American women's basketball players
Harvard Extension School alumni
1965 births
Living people
Shooting guards
American adoptees
Nebraska Cornhuskers women's basketball players
Arizona State University alumni
Wichita State University alumni
Junior college women's basketball players in the United States
Basketball players from Scottsdale, Arizona
American women's basketball coaches
Basketball players from Wichita, Kansas
Basketball players from Phoenix, Arizona